Bezanjerd-e Kordian (also Romanized as Bezanjerd-e Kordīān; also known as Bezāngerd and Bezanjerd) is a village in Bakharz Rural District, in the Central District of Bakharz County, Razavi Khorasan Province, Iran. At the 2006 census, its population was 455, in 100 families.

See also 

 List of cities, towns and villages in Razavi Khorasan Province

References 

Populated places in Bakharz County